Stjernebannertinde (Starry Banner Peak) is the highest mountain in the H. H. Benedict Range, a subrange of the Roosevelt Range, Northern Greenland.

The peak was first climbed in 1996 by the members of the American Top of the World Expedition (ATOW). It was one of the two main objectives of the expedition members in the northern part of Peary Land.

Geography
The same mountain is marked as a  peak in the A-5 sheet of the Defense Mapping Agency Navigation charts.

Administratively the Stjernebannertinde belongs to the Northeast Greenland National Park.

See also
List of mountains in Greenland
ATOW1996

References

External links
Oodaaq Ø and other short-lived islets north of Greenland, Polar Record 55(01):14–24, July 2019 DOI:10.1017/S0032247419000135

Mountains of Greenland
Roosevelt Range